This article describes the party affiliations of the leaders of each member-state represented in the European Council during the year 1998. The list below gives the political party that each head of government, or head of state, belonged to at the national level, as well as the European political alliance to which that national party belonged. The states are listed from most to least populous. More populous states have greater influence in the council, in accordance with the system of Qualified Majority Voting.

Summary

List of leaders (1 January 1998)

Changes

Affiliation

See also
Presidency of the Council of the European Union

External links
Council of the European Union (official website)

Lists of parties in the European Council